Ctenistini is a tribe of ant-loving beetles in the family Staphylinidae. There are at least four genera and about six described species in Ctenistini.

Genera
These four genera belong to the tribe Ctenistini:
 Atinus Horn, 1868 i c g b
 Biotus Casey, 1887 i c g b
 Ctenisis Raffray, 1890 i c g b
 Ctenisodes Raffray, 1897 i c g b
Data sources: i = ITIS, c = Catalogue of Life, g = GBIF, b = Bugguide.net

References

Further reading

 
 
 
 
 
 
 
 
 
 
 
 
 
 
 

Pselaphitae